Halahal is an Indian Hindi-language mystery thriller film which premiered on Eros Now on 21 September 2020. Based on M.P Vyapam scam. The film was written and produced by Zeishan Quadri and directed by Randeep Jha. Starring Sachin Khedekar and Barun Sobti. This film is loosely based on Vyapam Scam.

Plot
This film revolves with the journey of Doctor Shiv Shankar to find out the truth of his daughter's murder. Yusuf, a corrupt police inspector helps him to search the man behind the incident. It reveals that Shiv's daughter was killed but the case was fabricated as suicide. Big Medical education mafias are involved with the issue and unfortunately Shiv's daughter Archana was also a part of the racket.

Cast
 Sachin Khedekar as Dr. Shiv Shankar Sharma
 Barun Sobti as Inspector Yusuf Qureshi
 Manu Rishi Chadha as Bhaisahab
 Purnendu Bhattacharya as Acharya
 Archit Sharma as Sanaya
 Sanaya Bansal as Pooja
Anuradha Mukherjee as Nandini
Vijay Kumar Dogra as Manoj
Chetan Sharma as Ashish
Tilak Raj Joshi as Subhash
Hurmat Ali Khan as Prakash Rao
Dimple Kaur as Sunita
Jitender Gaur as Hooda

Reception 
Archika Khurana of The Times of India gave the film two and a half out of five stars stating "The story is griping in the beginning but tends to get a bit draggy towards the end. However, the final nail in the coffin is its unrealistic climax."

Writing in News18 Rohit Vats states "Minor flaws overlooked, Halahal is engaging for sure, and its lead talents are quite impressive. With careful project selection, the director can offer much more."

The Free Press Journal gave the movie three stars out of five and Heer Kothari states "Impressive performances make this film watchable."

References

External links
 

2020 films
2020s mystery thriller films
Indian mystery thriller films
Eros Now original films
2020 thriller films